The Gilman Ranch is a historic ranch and stagecoach station on the Bradshaw Trail, in Riverside County, California, United States.  The ranch is best known for its association with the manhunt of Willie Boy, a Paiute Indian who killed the father of Carlota, the woman he was forbidden to marry because they were cousins. They eloped and he shot her father after they returned.  The story was popularized by the book, written by Harry Lawton, and subsequent movie, starring Robert Redford and Robert Blake, named "Tell Them Willie Boy Is Here".

The ranch buildings are now protected as the Gilman Historic Ranch and Wagon Museum within the Gilman Ranch Historic Park, located in Banning. Displays include authentic wagons, including an Overland stagecoach, a “prairie schooner” and a chuck wagon, a saddle collection and Western ranching tools and artifacts. The museum and park are operated by Riverside County Parks.

The ranch complex is on the National Register of Historic Places.

See also
National Register of Historic Places listings in Riverside County, California

http://www.temeculahistory.org/publications/TVHS-News/2007%20thru%202012/2011-09_TVHS_Newsletter.pdf

References

External links
 Gilman Historic Ranch and Wagon Museum  - Riverside County Parks
http://www.temeculahistory.org/publications/TVHS-News/2007%20thru%202012/2011-09_TVHS_Newsletter.pdf

Ranches in California
Stagecoach stops in the United States
Banning, California
Former settlements in Riverside County, California
National Register of Historic Places in Riverside County, California
Ranches on the National Register of Historic Places in California
Bradshaw Trail
San Gorgonio Pass
Museums in Riverside County, California
Historic house museums in California
Transportation museums in California